Björn Ove Ingemar "Speed" Strid (born 10 September 1978) is a Swedish vocalist who has worked with bands such as Allegaeon, Disarmonia Mundi, Terror 2000, Coldseed, The Night Flight Orchestra, Act of Denial, Gizmachi, and most notably Soilwork.

Early life
Strid was born in Helsingborg. He gained the nickname "Speed" from fellow students as a result of the "extreme music" he was known to enjoy.

Career
Strid co-founded Soilwork in 1995 under the name Inferior Breed which was later changed to Soilwork once the fledgling band's sound began to take shape. He is the only original member still in the band. Most of Soilwork's lyrics are written by Strid himself.

Strid has also provided vocals for Darkane on their demo recording prior to Lawrence Mackrory joining the band before their debut album. He made a guest appearance on the Destruction track "The Alliance of Hellhoundz" alongside numerous other prominent metal singers, as well as appearing on Zero Tolerance's "Prime Time Mind Surgery", Phoenix-based metal band Howitzer's "245", and Danish band Mercenary's "Redefine Me", from their album The Hours That Remain. He has also recently provided guest vocals for the Seattle, Washington-based band Demon Hunter on the track "Collapsing" from their album The World Is a Thorn which was released on 9 March 2010, and also performed on power metal band Kamelot's Poetry for the Poisoned in the track "The Great Pandemonium". He also performed guest vocals on the track "Puppets 2: The Rain" by American metalcore band Motionless in White. Since February 2013 Bjorn began collaboration with the Russian modern metal band The Polygon that released 2014 the debut EP Stained Anger. Recently he performed the choruses on The Moor's new single "The Castaway" which was released on 27 July 2014. He also provided vocals on Earthside's song, "Crater", from their critically acclaimed debut album A Dream in Static.

Strid utilizes a varied vocal style, being able to quickly alternate between more guttural growls and higher screams and clean, harmonious vocals, and has gone on record as saying that Killing Machine, which was retitled as Hell Bent for Leather for US release by Judas Priest is his favorite album, but more recently has cited Iron Maiden's The Number of the Beast as his favourite.

Soilwork

Studio albums
 Steelbath Suicide (1998)
 The Chainheart Machine (2000)
 A Predator's Portrait (2001)
 Natural Born Chaos (2002)
 Figure Number Five (2003)
 Stabbing the Drama (2005)
 Sworn to a Great Divide (2007)
 The Panic Broadcast (2010)
 The Living Infinite (2013)
 The Ride Majestic (2015)
 Death Resonance (2016)
 Verkligheten (2019)
 Övergivenheten (2022)

The Night Flight Orchestra

Studio albums
 Internal Affairs (2012)
 Skyline Whispers (2015)
 Amber Galactic (2017)
 Sometimes the World Ain't Enough (2018)
 Aeromantic (2020)
 Aeromantic II (2021)

Act of Denial
 Negative (2021)

Stereo Tragedy
 “01” (2021)

Guest appearances

Strid has provided vocals for the following artists:

References

External links
 Official MySpace
 2005 interview with Björn Strid
 
 The Official Disarmonia Mundi website
 

1978 births
Living people
Swedish heavy metal singers
Swedish baritones
People from Helsingborg
Darkane members
21st-century Swedish singers
21st-century Swedish male singers
Soilwork members